Henry Ross Edwards (1870 – after 1899) was an English professional footballer who played in the Football League for Small Heath.

Edwards was born in Coventry, Warwickshire. An inside forward, he attracted the attention of the Small Heath club, whose scout went to watch him playing for Singer's; they signed him, together with his more impressive teammate Frank Mobley, who went on to score 64 goals in four seasons for Small Heath. Edwards played in the first five games of the 1892–93 season – Small Heath's first season in the Football League – and scored on his debut, in a 5–1 defeat of Port Vale, but could not compete with Billy Walton and the prolific Fred Wheldon. He played for Leicester Fosse in the Midland League and for Derby County, without appearing in their Football League side, before moving to Southern League club Wolverton L&NWR. Edwards settled well at Wolverton, playing as an attacking centre half, and stayed for three seasons before moving to fellow Southern League club Watford.

Edwards' younger brother Bill was also a professional footballer who played for Small Heath.

Edwards died in his native Coventry.

References

1870 births
Year of death missing
Footballers from Coventry
English footballers
Association football midfielders
Coventry City F.C. players
Birmingham City F.C. players
Leicester City F.C. players
Derby County F.C. players
Wolverton A.F.C. players
Watford F.C. players
Bedford Queens Works F.C. players
English Football League players
Southern Football League players
Date of birth missing
Football Alliance players